Edward Ellice may refer to:
Edward Ellice (merchant) (1783–1863), merchant and politician, and a prime mover behind the Reform Bill of 1832
Edward Ellice (Scottish politician) (1810–80), son of the above, Whig politician
Edward Charles Ellice (1858–1934), cousin of the second, Liberal MP for St Andrews Burghs

See also
Edward Ellis (disambiguation)